The Bozeman Irrigators were a minor league baseball team based in Bozeman, Montana. In 1909, the Irrigators played a partial season as members of the Class D level Inter-Mountain League. The Irrigators were preceded by an 1892 Bozeman team, which played as members of the Class B level Montana State League.

History
Bozeman, Montana first hosted minor league baseball in 1892. The 1892 Bozeman team became a member of the six–team, Class B level Montana State League, a league that played a split–season schedule. The Butte, Great Falls Smelter Cities, Helena, Missoula and Philipsburg Burgers teams joined Bozeman in league play.

Bozeman folded during the 1892 season. On July 23, 1892, the team disbanded at the start of the second half. Bozeman folded with an overall record of 10–8, playing  under manager B.E. Vaile. The Great Falls Smelter Cities folded on the same day. The 1892 Montana State League finished the season schedule with four teams and folded after the season was completed.

Minor league baseball returned to Bozeman during the 1909 season. On July 10, 1909, the Boise Irrigators of the Class D level Inter-Mountain League moved to Bozeman to finish the 1909 season. Boise had compiled a 13–38 record when the franchise moved to Bozeman on July 10. Bozeman hosted their first home game on July 15, 1909. On July 25, 1909, the Inter-Mountain League disbanded during the season. The Boise/Bozeman team ended the season with a record of 16–41, placing 4th in the four–team Inter-Mountain League, finishing 22.0 games behind the 1st place Helena Senators. The team was managed by Con Strouthers and Joe Marshall.

Bozeman, Montana has not hosted another minor league team.

The ballpark
The name of the Bozeman minor league ballpark(s) is not directly referenced. The Gallatin County Fairgrounds were in use in the era, constructed in 1903. Still in use today, the fairgrounds host amateur baseball at Heros Park.

Timeline

Year–by–year records

Notable alumni

Pop Dillon (1892)
Harry Gardner (1909)
Charlie Hoover (1892)
Joe Marshall (1909, MGR)
Joe Miller (1892)
Joe Moffet (1892)
Con Strouthers (1909, MGR)

See also
Bozeman Irrigators players

References

Defunct minor league baseball teams
Defunct baseball teams in Montana
Baseball teams established in 1892
Baseball teams disestablished in 1909
Bozeman, Montana
Gallatin County, Montana
Sports in Bozeman, Montana